Lana Roi  is a Canadian recording artist, songwriter, former beauty title holder, and commercial model. She is a former lead singer of the girl group EURASIA.

Early life 
Theresa Marie Fenger, better known by her stage name Lana Roi, was born in Halifax, Nova Scotia, of Filipino and German descent. In 1999 to 2001 she had vocal training for classical music and completed vocal coaching in Vancouver, Nashville , Philippines and Singapore. She studied film and television and acting in 2004 at Caledonia Secondary School. She earned a Bachelor of Music in Capilano University in 2007.

Career 
Fenger won her first singing talent award in 1999 at the age of 12 as "Most Outstanding Performer-Junior Category". She won a number of vocal and performance contests in British Columbia, Canada, and recorded her first original pop album Dancing On Air in Nashville, Tennessee in 2002 and a follow-up country album Me and You and Forever the year after. She then arranged her own concert to launch the albums. Later she performed at Merritt Mountain Music Festival. Theresa was chosen to sing the Canadian National Anthem on Canada Day which was shown on TV all over the Country. She was also a contestant on Canadian Idol 2004.

In 2004, she won Miss Global Teen Canada and went to represent her country in Calgary and again in Guatemala, where she won Miss Teen Mayan World, against all North America and Central America.

Fenger was one of the finalists of the MYX VJ Search 2009. After the search, she signed with Viva Entertainment and became lead vocalist for the girl group Eurasia which toured around Europe and Asia and opened for International artist, Neyo in Manila. Recorded their debut album in 2010 with their single "Working Girls" for the movie of the same title. She also won Century Tuna Superbods Challenge in 2009, becoming their endorser for almost two years. She is also the face of Gatorade Low Carb drink in the Philippines.

In November 2012, she opened for Jennifer Lopez's "Dance Again World Tour" singing her original song "Minamina" which she also performed on ASB-CBN's ASAP show. She continued guesting on noontime shows and had cameo acting roles as well on Philippine TV. Fenger went back into songwriting and released her album INNER BASE under PolyEast Records with her carrier single "It's Time". She won "Outstanding Female International Performer and Songwriter" at the 35th People's Choice Awards 2015 and also "Asia's Total Performing Diva" at the 26th Asia Pacific Awards 2015.

References 

Canadian songwriters
Canadian female models
Filipino songwriters
Filipino female models
1987 births
Living people
Capilano University alumni